Anjunabeats Volume Three is the third album in the Anjunabeats Volume compilation series mixed and compiled by British Trance DJs Above & Beyond released on 13 June 2005.

Track listing

References

External links 
Above & Beyond - Anjunabeats Volume Three at Discogs

2005 compilation albums
Above & Beyond (band) albums
Anjunabeats compilation albums
Sequel albums
Electronic compilation albums